Achille Salvagni (born 1970) is an Italian designer and architect, specialising in luxury residences, furniture and yacht interiors.

Early life

Born in Rome in 1970, Achille Salvagni grew up in Latina and went on to graduate from Sapienza University of Rome with a degree in architecture in 1998. He then spent a year studying in Sweden at the Royal Institute of Technology in Stockholm.

Career
In 2002, he founded Achille Salvagni Architetti, creating interiors for high-end properties and yachts. In 2013, he expanded into making bespoke furniture and lighting with the opening of the Achille Salvagni Atelier in Rome; his work was exhibited by the New York design gallery Maison Gerard in 2013. This was followed by the 2015 opening of a space on Grafton Street in Mayfair, London. Salvagni was added to the Elle Decor A-List of Designers in 2015.

His furniture and lighting has been exhibited at the Giustini/Stagetti Galleria O in Rome since 2017, as well as featuring in The Winter Show 2020 and PAD fairs throughout 2018-19, including PAD London. In 2019, Rizzoli Libri published a book about him showcasing his art.

His work is often characterised by its incorporation of materials such as bronze and onyx, as well as being heavily influenced by his Roman heritage and classical mythology.

Personal life 
Salvagni lives in the Coppedè neighborhood in Rome. He is a collector of Post-War Italian art.

References 

Living people
1970 births
21st-century Italian architects
Italian interior designers
Architects from Rome
People from Latina, Lazio
Sapienza University of Rome alumni